The Fiat Turbina was a gas turbine-powered concept car built by Italian car manufacturer Fiat in 1954.

Fiat was the second car manufacturer, after Rover, to introduce a car propelled by a gas turbine—Fiat touted the Turbina as "the first turbine car built in Continental Europe". The project took a long period of planning, studies began in 1948 and ended with a first track test on 14 April 1954 on the rooftop track of the Lingotto factory.
The car was first publicly shown on 23 April 1954 at the Turin-Caselle Airport, where it made some demonstration runs with Fiat chief test driver Carlo Salamano at the wheel. All major Fiat personalities were present, including Gianni Agnelli, president Vittorio Valletta and engineer Dante Giacosa, director of the technical office and responsible for the car's development. The Turbina was then displayed at the ongoing 36th Turin Motor Show.

The turbine engine was placed amidships, behind the passenger compartment. It consisted of a two-stage centrifugal compressor, three can-type combustors, a two-stage turbine driving the compressor, and a single-stage power turbine with a geared reduction to the rear wheels. There were no gearbox or clutch.

The concept was shelved due to high fuel usage and problems with overheating.

The Fiat Turbina is on display at the Automobile Museum of Turin.

See also
Chrysler Turbine Car
General Motors Firebird
Rover-BRM
Renault Étoile Filante

References

Turbina
Cars introduced in 1954
Cars powered by gas turbines